Vinko Pulišić (22 January 1853 - 6 February 1936) was the Catholic Archbishop of Zadar.

Notes

1853 births
1936 deaths
Bishops of Šibenik
20th-century Roman Catholic archbishops in Croatia
Archbishops of Zadar
Roman Catholic archbishops in Yugoslavia